Carnation latent virus (CLV, or Carlavirus) is a plant pathogenic virus of the family Betaflexiviridae.

External links
ICTVdB - The Universal Virus Database: Carnation latent virus
Family Groups - The Baltimore Method

Viral plant pathogens and diseases
Carlaviruses